Below is a list of Black nominees and winners of Golden Globe Awards in various award categories. Sidney Poitier was both the first winner and nominee, winning in 1964 for Lilies of the Field.

Film

Best Performance by an Actor in a Motion Picture – Drama

Notes:
 Out of the 34 nominated performances, 22 of them earned Academy Award nominations or wins.
 Denzel Washington is the most nominated in this category with 9 nominations.
 Sidney Poitier, Denzel Washington, Forest Whitaker, Chadwick Boseman, and Will Smith have won in this category.

Best Performance by an Actress in a Motion Picture – Drama

Notes:
 Out of the 13 nominated performances, 10 of them earned Academy Award nominations or wins.
 Viola Davis is the most nominated in this category with 3 nominations.
 Whoopi Goldberg and Andra Day have won in this category.

Best Performance by an Actor in a Motion Picture – Musical or Comedy

Notes:
 Out of the 12 nominated performances, 3 of them earned Academy Award nominations or wins.
 Eddie Murphy is the most nominated in this category with 4 nominations.
 Morgan Freeman and Jamie Foxx have won in this category.

Best Performance by an Actress in a Motion Picture – Musical or Comedy

Notes:
 Out of the 10 nominated performances, 2 of them earned Academy Award nominations.
 Currently, Angela Bassett is the only winner in this category.

Best Performance by an Actor in a Supporting Role in any Motion Picture

Notes:
 Out of the 19 nominated performances, 16 went on to earn Academy Award nominations or wins.
 Morgan Freeman, Samuel L. Jackson, and Mahershala Ali are the most nominated in this category with 2 nominations.
 Louis Gossett Jr., Denzel Washington, Eddie Murphy, Mahershala Ali, and Daniel Kaluuya have won in this category.

Best Performance by an Actress in a Supporting Role in any Motion Picture

Notes:
 Out of the 24 nominated performances, 20 went on to earn Academy Award nominations or wins.
 Octavia Spencer is the most nominated in this category with 3 nominations.
 Whoopi Goldberg, Jennifer Hudson, Mo'Nique, Octavia Spencer, Viola Davis, Regina King, Ariana DeBose, and Angela Bassett have won in this category.

Best Motion Picture – Animated

Best Director – Motion Picture

Notes:
 Out of the 6 nominees, 3 of them earned Academy Award nominations.
 Spike Lee is the most nominated in this category with 2 nominations.

Best Screenplay – Motion Picture

Notes:
 Out of the 5 nominees, 5 of them earned Academy Award nominations or wins.
 Barry Jenkins is the most nominated in this category with 2 nominations.

Best Original Score – Motion Picture

Notes:
 Out of the 7 nominees, 5 of them earned Academy Award nominations or wins.
 Quincy Jones is the most nominated in this category with 2 nominations.
 Isaac Hayes and Jon Batiste have won in this category.

Best Original Song – Motion Picture

Television

Best Performance by an Actor in a Television Series – Drama

Notes:
 Billy Porter is the most nominated in this category with 3 nominations.
 Currently, Sterling K. Brown is the only winner in this category.

Best Performance by an Actress in a Television Series – Drama

Notes:
 Denise Nicholas is the most nominated in this category with 3 nominations.
 Gail Fisher, Regina Taylor, Taraji P. Henson, Michaela Jaé Rodriguez, and Zendaya have won in this category.

Best Performance by an Actor in a Television Series – Musical or Comedy

Notes:
 Redd Foxx, Bill Cosby, and Don Cheadle are the most nominated in this category with 4 nominations.
 Flip Wilson, Redd Foxx, Bill Cosby, Don Cheadle, and Donald Glover have won in this category.

Best Performance by an Actress in a Television Series – Musical or Comedy

Notes:
 Isabel Sanford is the most nominated in this category with 5 nominations.
 Debbie Allen, Tracee Ellis Ross, and Quinta Brunson have won in this category.

Best Performance by an Actor in a Limited Series, Anthology Series, or a Motion Picture Made for Television

Notes:
 Idris Elba is the most nominated in this category with 4 nominations.
 Ving Rhames and Idris Elba have won in this category.

Best Performance by an Actress in a Limited Series, Anthology Series, or a Motion Picture Made for Television

Notes:
 Alfre Woodard, Halle Berry, and Queen Latifah are the most nominated in this category with 2 nominations.
 Alfre Woodard, Halle Berry, Queen Latifah, and S. Epatha Merkerson have won in this category.

Best Performance by an Actor in a Supporting Role on Television

Notes:
 Jimmie Walker and Blair Underwood are the most nominated in this category with 2 nominations.
 Louis Gossett Jr., Don Cheadle, Jeffrey Wright, and John Boyega have won in this category.

Best Performance by an Actor in a Supporting Role in a Musical-Comedy or Drama Television Series

Best Performance by an Actress in a Supporting Role on Television

Notes:
 Gail Fisher is the most nominated in this category with 3 nominations and is the only winner in this category.

Best Performance by an Actress in a Supporting Role in a Limited Series, Anthology Series, or a Motion Picture Made for Television

Best Performance by an Actress in a Supporting Role in a Musical-Comedy or Drama Television Series

By acting categories

Film

Men

Women

Television

Men

Women

Directing category

See also
 List of black Academy Award winners and nominees
List of Asian Golden Globe winners and nominees
 List of Golden Globe Awards ceremonies
 List of Golden Globe winners

References

 Black winners
Lists of black people